Rodrigo "Bebot" Abellana Abellanosa (born December 2, 1961) is a Filipino politician who served as the representative for the 2nd district (south district) of Cebu City from 2013 to 2022. He was a member of the Cebu City Council representing the 2nd district from 2004 to 2013, and was the barangay captain of Duljo Fatima, Cebu City from 1994 to 2004.

Early career
Abellanosa established the Asian Computer Institute (ACI), the precursor of Asian College of Technology (ACT) on September 19, 1988, in Colon Street, Cebu City. He went on to serve as president of ACT and Asian College of Technology International Education Foundation Inc. (ACTIEF).

Political career

Barangay captain (1994–2004)
Abellanosa served as Barangay Captain of Duljo-Fatima in Cebu City from 1994.

Cebu City Council (2004–2013)
Abellanosa served as City Councilor for three consecutive terms from 2004 to 2013.

He first ran as Councilor of the South District under Bando Osmeña – Pundok Kauswagan of Mayor Tomas Osmeña.

In the 10th Sangguniang Panlungsod (SP), he was designated as Chairman of the Committee on Family & Women and Committee on Local & International Relations.

In the 11th Sangguniang Panlungsod (SP), he was designated as Chairman of the Committee on Social Services. He also served as Vice Chairman of the Committee on Public Services and the Committee on Family & Women.

In the 12th Sangguniang Panlungsod (SP), he was designated as the Presiding Officer-Pro Tempore and Chairman of the Committee on Social Services. He also served as Vice Chairman of the Committee on Education, Science and Technology and the Committee on Trade, Commerce, Cooperatives and Entrepreneurship in the 12th SP.

House of Representatives (2013–present)
Abellanosa ran for Representative of Cebu City 2nd district (South) to succeed Tomas Osmeña who unsuccessfully ran as Mayor in the 2013 elections. He won against Aristotle Batuhan in 2013, Gerardo Carillo in 2016 and Jocelyn Pesquera in 2019.

He was supposed to run against Antonio Cuenco, the former 2nd District (South) Representative of Cebu City but on September 7, 2012, Cuenco announced that he was retiring from politics for health reasons. In a letter read by his son James Anthony Cuenco, the former Deputy Speaker said that he suffered vertigo during a sortie. Cuenco endorsed then Cebu City Councilor Jose Daluz III as his replacement but eventually, former DOTC undersecretary Aristotle "Totol" Batuhan was chosen by Team Rama to run against Abellanosa.
 
On December 13, 2012, a complaint was filed by a certain Phillip Banguiran, a resident of barangay Inayawan, Cebu City citing Republic Act 3019 or the Anti-Graft and Corrupt Practices Act by asking the Ombudsman in the Visayas to investigate Abellanosa because his school, Asian College of Technology, was the biggest recipient of the city's scholarship program.

On October 11, 2016, the Office of the Ombudsman filed a graft case before the anti-graft court Sandiganbayan against Abellanosa over an alleged P51-million anomalous transaction when he was a city councilor. He was accused of having an unlawful interest in Cebu City's distribution of PHP 51.065 million in scholarship programs when he was a city councilor in 2011.

Then Ombudsman Conchita Carpio-Morales approved the charge sheet against Abellanosa on September 29, 2016. The prosecution said that as a member of the Sangguniang Panglungsod, Abellanosa showed unlawful interest in the passage of City Resolution No. 12-3355-2011, which authorized the city mayor to enter into a Memorandum of Agreement (MOA) with the Asian College of Technology and International Educational Foundation (ACTIEF) where he was a trustee and president of ACTIEF at the time.

The prosecution said Abellanosa entered into an MOA with the Cebu City government on behalf of ACTIEF for the implementation of a city-funded scholarship program.

Records obtained by graft investigators showed ACTIEF was entrusted with PHP 51.065 million scholarship funds, which the Ombudsman said was prejudicial to the government and public interest.

The Ombudsman found him guilty of grave misconduct and meted him the penalty of dismissal of service but in a 10-page resolution that was promulgated on January 27, 2017, the Sandiganbayan granted the motion to quash information filed by Abellanosa, saying that the facts in the case do not constitute an offense. Thus, the higher court ordered to lift the hold-departure order issued against him and released the bond he posted for his provisional liberty.

In a 10-page decision promulgated on December 21, 2017, the Special 20th Division of the Court of Appeals (CA) reversed the decision of the Office of the Ombudsman finding Abellanosa guilty of grave misconduct for his involvement in the City Government's scholarship program while he was still a councilor thus allowing him to continue to serve as Congressman. Associate Justice Geraldine Fiel-Macaraig banked on the doctrine of condonation in favoring Abellanosa.

Macaraig, who pinned her opinion, which was affirmed by two other associate justices, said that contrary to the grounds of the Ombudsman, Abellanosa's election as congressman during the 2013 elections rendered the imposition of the administrative offense of grave misconduct moot and academic on the basis of condonation doctrine.

Based on the 2018 Statements of Assets, Liabilities and Net Worth (SALNs), Abellanosa remained as the richest Cebuano lawmaker who declared PHP 71.4 million net worth or actual wealth as of December 31, 2018.

Abellanosa's net worth is PHP 2.1 million more than his PHP 69.3 million net worth in 2017 while in 2016, he had PHP 68.8 million actual wealth. Since 2016 up to 2018, he declared no liabilities.

Legislative portfolio
As a member of 16th and 17th Congress, Abellanosa authored 170 bills and co-authored 76 bills.

Abellanosa is the principal author of the House version of the following laws:

Electoral history

House of Representatives

Personal life
Abellanosa has three children namely Jose Lorenzo, BG Rodrigo, and Angel Vianne.

References

1961 births
People from Cebu City
Members of the House of Representatives of the Philippines from Cebu City
Bando Osmeña – Pundok Kauswagan politicians
Asian Institute of Management alumni
University of the Philippines Diliman alumni
Ateneo de Manila University alumni
Living people